Tiger hawk

Starmont Community School District  is a rural public school district headquartered in Arlington, Iowa.

The district is located in sections of Fayette, Clayton, Buchanan, and Delaware counties.  It serves Arlington, Strawberry Point, Lamont, and the surrounding rural areas.

The district was formed in 1964, as a consolidation of schools in Strawberry Point, Arlington, and Lamont.

The mascot in the Stars, and the colors are black and gold.

Schools
The district operates three schools, all in a single facility in Arlington:
 Starmont Elementary School
 Starmont Middle School
 Starmont High School

See also
List of school districts in Iowa

References

External links
 Starmont Community School District
School districts in Iowa
Education in Clayton County, Iowa
Education in Fayette County, Iowa
Education in Buchanan County, Iowa
Education in Delaware County, Iowa
School districts established in 1964
1964 establishments in Iowa